The Prince Edward Island Rugby Union (PEIRU) is the provincial administrative body for rugby union in Prince Edward Island, Canada. 

Sport in Prince Edward Island
Rugby union governing bodies in Canada